Patrick Heron ( – 22 October 1761) was a Scottish politician.

Career 
He was the Member of Parliament (MP) for Kirkcudbright Stewartry from 1727 to 1741.

Patrick Heron was the heritor of the estate of Kirroughtree. As a landowner during the 1724 uprising of the Galloway Levellers he was instrumental in defusing a tense confrontation between Levellers and landowners.

References 
 

1672 births
Year of birth uncertain
1761 deaths
Members of the Parliament of Great Britain for Scottish constituencies
British MPs 1727–1734
British MPs 1734–1741